José Alberto Shaffer (born 16 December 1985) is an Argentine professional footballer who plays as a left wingback for Unión La Calera.

Career
In 2006, Shaffer was loaned on a one-year deal from Racing Club de Avellaneda to IFK Göteborg to replace the departing Oscar Wendt, who moved to FC Copenhagen. However, he did not manage to make a first team impact, and he subsequently moved back to Argentina after his short loan spell in Europe.

On 27 June 2009, it was announced that Shaffer had signed a deal with Portuguese club Benfica for €1.9 million. On 29 June, he was officially presented at Benfica's Estádio da Luz. However, after failing to hold on to a position in the first team, Shaffer moved once again back to Argentina on a 6-month loan to Banfield in January 2010.
In 2010–2011 he was loaned to Rosario Central, until the end of the season. In 2011–2012, Shaffer was loaned to União Leiria.

On 27 September 2012, Shaffer terminated is contract with Benfica. In July 2013, he signed with Talleres de Córdoba. A year later, he joined Unión La Calera in Chile.

Career statistics

Honours
Benfica
Primeira Liga: 2009–10

References

External links
 Argentine Primera statistics at Fútbol XXI  
 
 
 

1985 births
Living people
Footballers from Córdoba, Argentina
Argentine footballers
Argentine expatriate footballers
Association football fullbacks
IFK Göteborg players
Racing Club de Avellaneda footballers
S.L. Benfica footballers
Club Atlético Banfield footballers
Rosario Central footballers
Unión La Calera footballers
U.D. Leiria players
Chilean Primera División players
Argentine Primera División players
Allsvenskan players
Primeira Liga players
Expatriate footballers in Chile
Expatriate footballers in Sweden
Expatriate footballers in Portugal
Argentine people of German descent